Álvaro de Sá Freire (born 2 March 1909, date of death unknown) was a Brazilian rower. He competed in the men's coxed four at the 1936 Summer Olympics.

References

External links
 

1909 births
Year of death missing
Brazilian male rowers
Olympic rowers of Brazil
Rowers at the 1936 Summer Olympics
Rowers from Rio de Janeiro (city)